The International Standard Name Identifier (ISNI) is an identifier system for uniquely identifying the public identities of contributors to media content such as books, television programmes, and newspaper articles. Such an identifier consists of 16 digits. It can optionally be displayed as divided into four blocks.

ISNI can be used to disambiguate named entities that might otherwise be confused, and links the data about names that are collected and used in all sectors of the media industries.

It was developed under the auspices of the International Organization for Standardization (ISO) as Draft International Standard 27729; the valid standard was published on 15 March 2012. The ISO technical committee 46, subcommittee 9 (TC 46/SC 9) is responsible for the development of the standard.

ISNI format
The FAQ of the isni.org websites states "An ISNI is made up of 16 digits, the last character being a check character."

Format without space
MARC: it was proposed to store the ISNI without spaces, e.g.(isni)1234567899999799
isni.org URL: no spaces, e.g. 
http://www.isni.org/isni/000000012146438X (old)
https://isni.org/isni/000000012146438X (current)
https://isni.org/000000012146438X (alternative)
viaf.org:
URL https://viaf.org/viaf/sourceID/ISNI%7C000000012146438X
URL https://viaf.org/processed/ISNI%7C000000012146438X
the data dumps contain it in form ISNI|000000012146438X

Format with space
In display it is frequently shown with spaces.
isni.org
viaf.org

Uses of an ISNI
The ISNI allows a single identity (such as an author's pseudonym or the imprint used by a publisher) to be identified using a unique number. This unique number can then be linked to any of the numerous other identifiers that are used across the media industries to identify names and other forms of identity.

An example of the use of such a number is the identification of a musical performer who is also a writer both of music and of poems. While they might be identified in various databases using numerous private and public identification systems, under the ISNI system, they would have a single linking ISNI record. The many different databases could then exchange data about that particular identity without resorting to messy methods such as comparing text strings. An often quoted example in the English language world is the difficulty faced when identifying 'John Smith' in a database. While there may be many records for 'John Smith', it is not always clear which record refers to the specific 'John Smith' that is required.

If an author has published under several different names or pseudonyms, each such name will receive its own ISNI.

ISNI can be used by libraries and archives when sharing catalogue information; for more precise searching for information online and in databases, and it can aid the management of rights across national borders and in the digital environment.

ORCID
ORCID (Open Researcher and Contributor ID) identifiers consist of a reserved block of ISNI identifiers for scholarly researchers and administered by a separate organisation. Individual researchers can create and claim their own ORCID identifier. The two organisations coordinate their efforts.

Organisations involved in the management

ISNI Registration Authority
According to ISO the Registration Authority for ISO 27729:2012 is the "ISNI International Agency".  It is located in London (c/o EDItEUR)

It is incorporated under the Companies Act 2006 as a private company limited by guarantee.

The 'International Agency' is commonly known as the ISNI-IA.

This UK registered, not-for-profit company has been founded by a consortium of organisations consisting of the Confédération Internationale des Sociétés d'Auteurs et Compositeurs (CISAC), the Conference of European National Librarians (CENL), the International Federation of Reproduction Rights Organisations (IFRRO), the International Performers Database Association (IPDA), the Online Computer Library Center (OCLC) and ProQuest. It is managed by directors nominated from these organisations and, in the case of CENL, by representatives of the Bibliothèque nationale de France and the British Library.

ISNI Registration Agencies 
A registration agency provides the interface between ISNI applicants and the ISNI Assignment Agency.

In 2018, YouTube became an ISNI registry, and announced its intention to begin creating ISNI IDs for the musicians whose videos it features. ISNI anticipates the number of ISNI IDs "going up by perhaps 3-5 million over the next couple of years" as a result.

In 2020, Sound Credit, together with ISNI, announced that music industry ISNI registrations were free and automated.  The free registration system is part of Sound Credit user profile creation, used by its larger system for music crediting.  It includes an automated search to avoid duplicate ISNIs and a certificate generated by the Sound Credit registration system to officiate newly registered ISNIs.

ISNI members
ISNI members (ISNI-IA Members) -07-11:

ABES (French Bibliographic Agency for Higher Education)
Brill Publishers
CEDRO (Centro Español de Derechos Reprográficos)
CDR (Centrale Discotheek Rotterdam)
Copyrus
FCCN
French National Archives (Archives nationales de France)
Harvard University
Iconoclaste
Irish Copyright Licensing Agency (ICLA)
ISSN International Centre
La Trobe University
Library of Congress
MacOdrum Library, Carleton University
National Library of Finland
National Library of New Zealand
National Library of Norway
National Library of Sweden (Kungliga Biblioteket)
Publishers' Licensing Services
UNSW Library

Copyright
A subset of the data is available under CC0.

ISNI assignment
ISNI-IA uses an assignment system comprising a user interface, data-schema, disambiguation algorithms, and database that meets the requirements of the ISO standard, while also using existing technology where possible. The system is based primarily on the Virtual International Authority File (VIAF) service, which has been developed by OCLC for use in the aggregation of library catalogues.

Access to the assignment system and database, and to the numbers that are generated as the output of the process, are controlled by independent bodies known as 'registration agencies'. These registration agencies deal directly with customers, ensuring that data is provided in appropriate formats and recompensing the ISNI-IA for the cost of maintaining the assignment system. Registration agencies are appointed by ISNI-IA but will be managed and funded independently.

ISNI coverage

The following table lists ISNI coverage counts, for millions of identities of all types, millions of people, millions of researchers (also included in people), and organisations.

See also
 Authority control
 Digital Author Identification (DAI)
 Digital object identifier (DOI)
 GRID
 International Standard Text Code (ISTC)
 ResearcherID
 Ringgold identifier

References

Further reading
 Karen Smith-Yoshimura, Janifer Gatenby, Grace Agnew, Christopher Brown, Kate Byrne, Matt Carruthers, Peter Fletcher, Stephen Hearn, Xiaoli Li, Marina Muilwijk, Chew Chiat Naun, John Riemer, Roderick Sadler, Jing Wang, Glen Wiley, and Kayla Willey. 2016. "Addressing the Challenges with Organizational Identifiers and ISNI." Dublin, Ohio: OCLC Research.

External links

ISO standards
Unique identifiers
Library cataloging and classification